Ken Zheng (born April 5, 1995) is an Indonesian actor, screenwriter and martial artist. He began his career as a martial artist at a young age, and has since starred in Brush with Danger (2014) and an action thriller entitled Insight (2021)  starring Tony Todd, John Savage, Keith David, Madeline Zima, Sean Patrick Flanery, and directed by his sister Livi Zheng.

Early life
Ken Zheng was born in Jakarta on April 5, 1995. At 10 years old, he moved to Beijing, China with his older sister Livi Zheng.

Martial arts and stunt work
Zheng began training in martial arts at an early age, joined the Indonesian National Kick-boxing team in 2010, and when Zheng turned 16, he became the youngest kickboxing champion in Indonesia's history. Zheng would go to win the championship once more, and also placed 5th in the 2012 World Kick Boxing Championship in Macau.

Education
While attending the Western Academy of Beijing, Zheng began creating his own films and documentaries, co-founding and building an educational outreach service group for poorly funded rural Chinese schools, and shooting and assembling the school's special event coverage for the Academy's Film department.  At the academy, Zheng also began making documentaries focusing on another one of his passions:  Education for children of poor and migrant workers. He wrote and directed a documentary about the Book-a-Book Foundation, a group he co-founded composed of high school students who raised money to create a mobile library service for under-developed migrant schools around Beijing. Zheng also shot a documentary about Children’s Hope Foundation, which serves Beijing’s most impoverished schools, and the Hearts 4 Arts Foundation about high school students who provides arts education to migrant students.

Zheng graduated with a bachelor's degree from the Radio, TV and Film Production at the University of Texas-Austin.

Filmography

Film

Television

Brush with Danger
Zheng wrote, starred in and did stunt work for Brush with Danger, which was shot in Seattle and Los Angeles. The film tells a story about a painter, a fighter, both artists in their own way. Brother and sister, forced to flee their home, arrive at Seattle, The Emerald City, inside a shipping container. Trying to make their way in a new strange world the pair struggle to survive. Until, one day, an art dealer, takes an interest in the sister's painting, and the pair find themselves living a dream come true. The sister loses herself in her art, painting, and the brother seizes the opportunity to express himself, as a fighter.

But it really is all just a dream. Conned by her patron into forging a long lost Van Gogh. Purchased by a ruthless criminal with a passion for fine art. The brother and sister soon find themselves embroiled in Seattle's criminal underworld and a Brush With Danger.

Brush With Danger was released theatrically in the United States starting September 19, 2014. Following the release in the United States, Brush With Danger was distributed internationally.

Insight
Recently, Livi Zheng reassembled her filmmaking team from Brush with Danger to shoot the Los Angeles-set action thriller, starring Ken Zheng, Tony Todd, John Savage, Keith David, Madeline Zima and Sean Patrick Flanery.

References

External links
 

Indonesian male kickboxers
1995 births
Living people
21st-century Indonesian male actors
Indonesian screenwriters
Indonesian people of Chinese descent